The main article of this list is College athletics in the United States.

U.S. States
List of college athletic programs in Alabama
List of college athletic programs in Alaska
List of college athletic programs in Arizona
List of college athletic programs in Arkansas
List of college athletic programs in California
List of college athletic programs in Colorado
List of college athletic programs in Connecticut
List of college athletic programs in Delaware
List of college athletic programs in Florida
List of college athletic programs in Georgia
List of college athletic programs in Hawaii
List of college athletic programs in Idaho
List of college athletic programs in Illinois
List of college athletic programs in Indiana
List of college athletic programs in Iowa
List of college athletic programs in Kansas
List of college athletic programs in Kentucky
List of college athletic programs in Louisiana
List of college athletic programs in Maine
List of college athletic programs in Maryland
List of college athletic programs in Massachusetts
List of college athletic programs in Michigan
List of college athletic programs in Minnesota
List of college athletic programs in Mississippi
List of college athletic programs in Missouri
List of college athletic programs in Montana
List of college athletic programs in Nebraska
List of college athletic programs in Nevada
List of college athletic programs in New Hampshire
List of college athletic programs in New Jersey
List of college athletic programs in New Mexico
List of college athletic programs in New York
List of college athletic programs in North Carolina
List of college athletic programs in North Dakota
List of college athletic programs in Ohio
List of college athletic programs in Oklahoma
List of college athletic programs in Oregon
List of college athletic programs in Pennsylvania
List of college athletic programs in Rhode Island
List of college athletic programs in South Carolina
List of college athletic programs in South Dakota
List of college athletic programs in Tennessee
List of college athletic programs in Texas
List of college athletic programs in Utah
List of college athletic programs in Vermont
List of college athletic programs in Virginia
List of college athletic programs in Washington
List of college athletic programs in West Virginia
List of college athletic programs in Wisconsin
List of college athletic programs in Wyoming

See also
List of college athletic programs in Washington, D.C.
List of college athletic programs in Puerto Rico

Canada

NCAA Division II

NAIA

See also
List of NCAA Division I athletic directors
List of NCAA Division I institutions
List of NCAA Division II institutions
List of NCAA Division III institutions
List of NAIA institutions
List of NJCAA Division I schools
List of NJCAA Division II schools
List of NJCAA Division III schools
List of USCAA institutions
List of NCCAA institutions

 
College athletic programs by U.S. State
College Athletic Programs